Dump Trump is a  high statue of former United States President Donald Trump sitting on a golden toilet. The sculpture was temporarily installed in Central London's Trafalgar Square ahead of his 2019 visit to the United Kingdom, and displayed during the Trump-organised Salute to America in Washington DC, on 4 July 2019.

Description and history 

In addition to depicting Donald Trump tweeting from a smartphone on a golden toilet while wearing a MAGA hat with "IMPEACH ME!" scribbled on it, the  statue makes flatulence noises and says the phrases "I'm a very stable genius", "no collusion", "witch-hunt", and "you are fake news". The statue was designed by dinosaur expert and author Don Lessem and cost approximately $25,000. "I'm interested in things that are big, not very intelligent and have lost their place in history", the artist commented.

The statue was temporarily installed in Central London's Trafalgar Square ahead of his 2019 visit to the United Kingdom. It was displayed during the Trump-organised Salute to America event in Washington, D.C. on 4 July 2019.

See also
 2019 in art
 Donald Trump baby balloon
 The Emperor Has No Balls
 Trump Buddha

References

2019 in London
2019 in politics
2019 protests
2019 sculptures
Outdoor sculptures in London
Parodies of Donald Trump
Political art
Protests against Donald Trump
Protests in London
Statues in London
Statues of Donald Trump
Trafalgar Square